Elīna Garanča (born 16 September 1976) is a Latvian mezzo-soprano. She began to study singing in her hometown of Riga in 1996 and continued her studies in Vienna and in the United States. By 1999 she had won first place in a significant competition in Finland and had begun a career in Europe. Worldwide engagements followed her 2003 Salzburg Festival appearances. She is fluent in Latvian, Spanish, Russian, and English.

Early life and education
Elīna Garanča was born in the Latvian city of Riga into a musical family: her father was a choral director, and her mother Anita was a lieder singer, a professor at the Latvian Academy of Music, an associate professor at the Latvian Academy of Culture, a vocal music teacher at the Latvian National Opera, and also a private voice tutor.

Career in opera
She entered the Latvian Academy of Music in 1996 to study singing with Sergej Martinov. She continued her studies in Vienna with Irina Gavrilovich and in the United States with Virginia Zeani. Garanča began her professional career at the Meiningen Court Theatre, Meiningen, Germany in 1998, and later worked at the Frankfurt Opera. In 1999, she won the Mirjam Helin Singing Competition in Helsinki, Finland.

Garanča's international breakthrough came in 2003 at the Salzburger Festspiele when she sang Annio in a production of Mozart's La clemenza di Tito, conducted by Nikolaus Harnoncourt. Major engagements followed quickly, such as Charlotte in Werther, Dorabella in Così fan tutte at the Vienna State Opera (2004) and Dorabella in a Paris production directed by Patrice Chéreau (2005). In 2006, she returned to La clemenza di Tito, this time singing the part of Sesto. On 12 January 2008 Garanča made her company and house debut at the Metropolitan Opera in New York, in the role of Rosina in Rossini's Il barbiere di Siviglia. Of her debut, Bernard Holland wrote in The New York Times: "Ms. Garanca is the real thing ... Modern singing techniques adapt with difficulty to Rossini's early-19th-century emphasis on speed, lightness and athletic articulation, and Ms. Garanca was the only one onstage sounding completely comfortable. The lyric passages sang out; the episodes of racecourse delivery were fully in hand". Garanča sang the leading role of Georges Bizet's Carmen in the 2010 and 2015 productions of the Metropolitan Opera. In the opening concert of the 2011 Rheingau Musik Festival in the Eberbach Abbey she performed Alban Berg's Sieben frühe Lieder with the hr-Sinfonieorchester, conducted by Paavo Järvi.

In May 2018 Garanča made her stage role debut as Dalila in Camille Saint-Saëns' Samson et Dalila at the Vienna State Opera conducted by Marco Armiliato.
In 2018, she appeared in the Metropolitan Opera's performance of that opera.

Awards and honours

 1999: First Place: Mirjam Helin International Singing Competition (Finland)
 2000: Latvian Great Music Award
 2001: Finalist: Cardiff BBC Singer of the World Competition (UK)
 2005: Nominated: Grammy Award for the recording of Bajazet
 2006: MIDEM Classical Award: "Best Opera", recording of Vivaldi's Bajazet with Fabio Biondi, conductor; Patrizia Ciofi, David Daniels, Ildebrando D'Arcangelo, Vivica Genaux and Marijana Mijanovic.
 2006: European Culture Prize in Music (Soloist Category) awarded by the Pro Europa / European Foundation for Culture (Switzerland/Germany)
 2007: Echo Klassik Award: "Singer of the Year" for the solo CD "Aria Cantilena"
 2007: Three-Star Order: awarded by the Latvian State
 2009: Echo Klassik Award: "Singer of the Year"
 2010: Musical America Award: "Vocalist of the Year"
 2010: MIDEM Classical Award: "Singer of the Year"
 2010: Latvian Great Music Award
 2013: Austrian Kammersängerin
 2013: Echo Klassik Award: "Best Solo Recording of the Year", (duets/opera/opera arias for Romantique, works by Berlioz, Donizetti, Gounod, Lalo, Saint-Saëns, Tchaikovsky and Vaccai). Filarmonica del Teatro Comunale di Bologna, cond. Yves Abel
 2015: Echo Klassik Award: "Solo recording of the year"
 2018: Rigan of the Year (Gada rīdzinieks)
 2019: Latvian Excellence Award in Culture.

Repertoire
Garanča's repertoire includes:

Recordings
Her recordings include the Grammy Award winning Bajazet conducted by Fabio Biondi, in which she sang the role of Andronicus. In 2005, Garanča signed an exclusive contract with Deutsche Grammophon.

Other audio recordings include:

 I Capuleti e i Montecchi by Vincenzo Bellini
 Norma by Vincenzo Bellini
 Il barbiere di Siviglia by Gioachino Rossini
 Arie Favorite, Ondine
 Habanera, Deutsche Grammophon 2010 2894778776
 Aria Cantilena, Deutsche Grammophon
 Mozart: Opera and Concert Arias, EMI Classics
 Bel Canto, Deutsche Grammophon
 Romantique, Deutsche Grammophon
 The Opera Gala: Live from Baden-Baden ft. Anna Netrebko, Ramón Vargas, and Ludovic Tézier
 Elina: The Best of Elina Garanča, Deutsche Grammophon  2013 2894792241
 Revive: Elina Garanca and Orquestra de la Comunitat Valenciana and Roberto Abbado, Deutsche Grammophon 2016 2894795937
 Elina Garanca Meditation Karel Mark Chichon conducting Deutsche Radio Philharmonic and Latvian Radio Choir  Deutsche Grammophon 2014 2894792071
 Elina Garanca Mozart Vivaldi Parliphone Records LTD A Warner Music Group Company Erato 2005 190295905996
 Elina Garanca Mozart Opera & Concert Arias Camerata Saltzburg Louis Langree  Virgin Classics 
 Elgar Barenboim Sea Pictures Elina Garanca Falstaff Staatskapelle Berlin Decca Classics 2020 2894850968
 Lieder Elīna Garanča, Malcolm Martineau,  Robert Schumann Frauenliebe und Leben op. 42, Johannes Brahms, Heimweh II: “O wüsst’ ich doch den Weg zurück” op. 63 no. 8, Liebe und Frühling II: “Ich muss hinaus” op. 3 no. 3, Liebestreu op. 3 no. 1 · Mädchenlied op. 107 no. 5, O kühler Wald op. 72 no. 3 · Verzagen op. 72 no. 4, O liebliche Wangen op. 47 no. 4 · Geheimnis op. 71 no. 3, Wir wandelten op. 96 no. 2 · Alte Liebe op. 72 no. 1, Die Mainacht op. 43 no. 2 · Von ewiger Liebe op. 43 no. 1, November 6, 2020 Deutsche Grammophon 2020

DVD recordings include:

 Anna Bolena by Donizetti. Recording from Vienna State Opera
 La Cenerentola by Gioachino Rossini
 Carmen by Georges Bizet

Personal life
Garanča is married to the conductor Karel Mark Chichon, and they have two daughters.

References

Bibliography
  ("The shoes are really important"), Ecowin Verlag GmbH 2013, ; Garanča's first autobiography.
  (Between the Worlds: My way to the great opera stages), Ecowin Verlag GmbH 2019, ; Garanča's second autobiography.

External links
 
 Elīna Garanča on Operabase
 

1976 births
Living people
Musicians from Riga
20th-century Latvian women opera singers
Operatic mezzo-sopranos
21st-century Latvian women opera singers
Latvian Academy of Music alumni
Österreichischer Kammersänger